Jonathan Lomas (born 7 May 1968) is an English professional golfer.

Lomas was born in Chesterfield, Derbyshire. He turned professional in 1988. He won three times on the second tier Challenge Tour in 1992 and 1993 and was named as the European Tour's Sir Henry Cotton Rookie of the Year in 1994.

Lomas's best season on the European Tour was 1996, when he won the Czech Open and finished 20th on the Order of Merit. He also represented England in the Alfred Dunhill Cup that year. He held on to his tour card until 2007, and except for a few invitations to tour events, has mainly played tournaments and pro-ams on the Scottish professional circuit since then.

Professional wins (6)

European Tour wins (1)

Challenge Tour wins (3)

Other wins (2)
1996 Open Novotel Perrier (with Steven Bottomley)
1999 Mauritius Open

Results in major championships

CUT = missed the half-way cut
"T" = tied
Note: Lomas never played in the Masters Tournament or the PGA Championship.

Team appearances
Dunhill Cup (representing England): 1996

External links

English male golfers
European Tour golfers
Sportspeople from Chesterfield, Derbyshire
Sportspeople from Ayr
1968 births
Living people